Farah Bagh (also called as Faria Bagh) is situated in Ahmednagar, Maharashtra. It is a palace build by Nizam Shahi rulers in Ahmednagar.

History 
Farah Bagh was the centrepiece of a huge palacial complex completed in 1583. It were the special possessions of the royal household and Murtaza Nizam Shah often retired here to play chess with a Delhi singer whom he called Fateh Shah and also built for him a separate mahal called Lakad Mahal in the garden.

Architecture 
The central eight-sided palace is now in ruins and except an embankment no signs of the pond remains. Between this garden and the city are seventy domes and forty mosques said to have contained the tombs of many of the royal favorites.

References

Buildings and structures completed in 1583
Ahmednagar
Palaces in Maharashtra